Senator Andrus may refer to:

Cecil Andrus (1931–2017), Idaho State Senate
Henry Andrus (1844–1935), Illinois State Senate